Islington College is an educational institution in Kathmandu, Nepal. It was established in 1997 as a regular franchisee of Singapore main-board listed Informatics Education Limited (IEL). The college directly partners with London Metropolitan University (LondonMet) to deliver their bachelor's degrees in Computing; Computer Networking & IT Security and Multimedia Technologies programmes for in-country provision.

Dawning upon its new partnerships with UK universities, the college changed its name to Islington College in 2011.

Programmes in IT Degree

Masters Degree in IT and Applied Security

BSc (Hons) in Computing

The course is designed for those students who wish to specialize in the development and maintenance of modern computer-based systems. There are four areas that characterize the course.

Bachelor Degree (Hons.) in Computer Networking and IT Security

The course aims to provide students with expertise in the field of computer networks and IT security. It emphasizes all aspects of computer networking and IT security, whether wired or wireless.

Bachelor Degree (Hons.) in Multimedia Technologies

Multimedia unites digital culture, media and computer technology with networks and creativity, allowing for new ways of expression, production, exchange and leisure to emerge.

Programmes in Business Degree

Bachelor Degree (Hons) Business Administration (International Business)

This course aims to develop students' intellectual and quantitative skills in the understanding and analysis of internal business issues. Students can acquire skills to enhance their learning skills and personal development so that they can make a positive contribution to the business world and society.

Bachelor Degree (Hons) Business Administration (Finance) With International Business or Marketing

This course aims to provide students with a wide range of careers within the financial sector, from portfolio and risk management to corporate finance, accounting and trading.

Bachelor Degree (Hons) Business Administration (Marketing) With International Business

This course aims to provide students with marketing knowledge and skills that can be applied in many different sectors. Progressive and critical approaches are taken by this course in which organizations identify and respond to their customers' needs by exploration of marketing concepts and showing how to apply them successfully.

Activities

Islington College Mozilla Orientation Seminar
Mozilla Nepal Community presented an orientation session on Mozilla with coordination from Islington Open Source Community where students were told how they can contribute to the open source scenario that is found in Nepal.

Tie with Yeti Himalayan Sherpa Club (HSC)
Sulav Budhathoki, the president and CEO of Islington College, handed over a cheque of Rs 800,000 to the president of HSC Karma Chiring Sherpa. Speaking at the function, Budhathoki said that the college decided to tie-up with HSC because of the college family's fondness for the 'beautiful game'. He said that it was just the beginning and that the support will get continuity in the future too. HSC's main sponsor Yeti Airlines provides Rs 2 million annually.

Firefox OS App Days
Following the path of App Days organized around world by Mozilla communities, the Mozilla Nepal community has taken a step to organize an App Day. We will be targeting web developers as done in other App Days, too.

Startup Weekend Kathmandu Women's Edition
Startup Weekend is a global grassroots movement of active and empowered entrepreneurs who are learning the basics of founding startups and launching successful ventures. According to their website, "It is a community of passionate entrepreneurs with over 400 past events in 100 countries around the world in 2011."

See also
Itahari International College

References

External links

Education in Kathmandu
Universities and colleges in Nepal
1997 establishments in Nepal